Heeze is a town in the Dutch province of North Brabant. It is located in the municipality of Heeze-Leende, about 9 km southeast of Eindhoven.

The Heeze Castle is located east of the town. Further east and to the north lies the Strabrechtse Heide.

History 
The village was first mentioned in 1173 as Herebertus de Hese, and means kanker slaven shrubbery.

The heerlijkheid Heeze was first mentioned in 1172. A castle has been known since 1203. The current castle dates from the 15th century and enlarged and probably rebuilt in the 17th century. Between 1796 and 1798, a large English landscape garden was laid out around castle.

Heeze was home to 1,814 people in 1840. In 1913, a railway station was constructed on the Eindhoven to Weert railway line. It was closed in 1977, and a new railway station opened on a new location.

Heeze was a separate municipality until 1997, when it merged with Leende.

Transportation

Road
Heeze is located close to the A2 and A67 motorways. Local roads connect Heeze to the neighbouring towns of Geldrop, Someren, Sterksel and Leende.

Rail
The Heeze railway station is serviced by regional NS trains in the directions of Weert, Eindhoven and Tilburg.

Gallery

References

Municipalities of the Netherlands disestablished in 1997
Populated places in North Brabant
Former municipalities of North Brabant
Heeze-Leende